God Friended Me is an American comedy-drama television series created by Steven Lilien and Bryan Wynbrandt. It stars Brandon Micheal Hall, Violett Beane, Suraj Sharma, Javicia Leslie, Joe Morton and Erica Gimpel. The series was ordered on May 11, 2018 and premiered on September 30, 2018, and concluded with a two-hour series finale on April 26, 2020, on CBS. CBS renewed the series for a second season which premiered on September 29, 2019. In March 2020, season 2 filming was suspended due to the COVID-19 pandemic. In April 2020, the series was canceled after two seasons.

Plot
The series chronicles the life of Miles Finer (Hall), an outspoken atheist and podcaster, who is sent a friend request on Facebook by an account named "God". This account suggests new friends to Miles, people in his hometown of New York City, who will require assistance. Initially skeptical, Miles decides to follow these suggestions to help people. His first suggestion is a doctor who lost a patient and is on the verge of losing his girlfriend. While following up on his second suggestion, he meets and befriends Cara (Beane), a struggling magazine writer. Together with Cara and his hacker friend Rakesh (Sharma), Miles tries to find out who is behind the "God" account while still providing help to the account's continuing friend suggestions. Miles' atheist views sometimes cause friction with his father (Morton), who is the pastor of an Episcopal church in Harlem.

Use of Facebook
God Friended Me uses Facebook frequently as a narrative device. The "Friended" in the title God Friended Me refers to the act of friending someone on social media, granting that person special privileges (on the service in question) with respect to oneself. In God Friended Me, this allows for God to contact Miles.

While the majority of Facebook's revenue is advertisement-derived, show creator Steven Lilien says that their conversations with Facebook have been limited to discussing "how much we can portray it." According to executive producer Bryan Wynbrandt, the "God" of the show will be active on Facebook outside the show, with liking pages and changing their profile picture given as examples of their possible online activities.

Cast

Main 
Brandon Micheal Hall as Miles Finer, a skeptical atheist who hosts a podcast about his atheism. Miles’ life is thrown into chaos when he is friended by an account named "God" on Facebook, which then sends him friend suggestions. This sends him on journeys to change people's lives.
Violett Beane as Cara Bloom, a journalist who is Miles' second friend suggestion. She becomes friends with Miles and Rakesh, helping them with God account cases. She and Miles start a romantic relationship, which is tested when a God account case comes between them.
Suraj Sharma as Rakesh Singh, a hacker and friend of Miles
Joe Morton as Arthur Finer, Miles' father who is the long-time pastor of Harlem Episcopal church and later the Bishop of New York
Javicia Leslie as Ali Finer, Miles' sister and Arthur's daughter
Erica Gimpel as Trish Allen, Arthur's girlfriend and then wife (season 2; recurring season 1)

Recurring

Notable guest stars

Episodes

Season 1 (2018–19)

Season 2 (2019–20)

Production

Development
On August 31, 2017, it was announced that Steven Lilien and Wynbrandt had decided to develop the pilot and had teamed with Greg Berlanti and Sarah Schechter to develop the concept. Warner Bros. Television was shopping the show to the American broadcast networks. Both Lilien and Wynbrandt would write the series, while Berlanti and Schechter would serve as executive producers through Berlanti Productions, and Marcos Siega would direct the pilot. CBS ordered a pilot on January 23, 2018. In addition to Berlanti and Schechter, Lilien and Wynbrandt would also serve as executive producers for the series. The pilot was picked up straight-to-series by CBS on May 11, 2018 and the series premiered on September 30, 2018. On October 19, 2018, CBS picked up the series for a full season of 20 episodes.

On January 29, 2019, the series was renewed for a second season which premiered on September 29, 2019. On March 13, 2020, Warner Bros. Television announced that production would be suspended due to the COVID-19 pandemic. On April 14, 2020, CBS announced the series had been canceled after two seasons, and the last two episodes aired on April 26, 2020. The last-filmed episode was reworked into a series finale, mainly by using unused footage originally filmed for the pilot.

Casting
On February 5, 2018, it was announced that Brandon Micheal Hall had joined the production as Miles Finer. Several additional cast members were announced in February 2018. Suraj Sharma and Javicia Leslie would portray Rakesh Singh and Ali Finer, then four days later Joe Morton was announced as Rev. Arthur Finer. Finally, Violett Beane was cast as Cara Bloom.

On June 11, 2019, it was reported that Erica Gimpel was promoted as a series regular for second season.

Reception

Critical response
On the review aggregator website Rotten Tomatoes, the series has an approval rating of 59%  based on 29 reviews, with an average rating of 6.36 out of 10. The site's critical consensus for season one reads, "A sincere and thoughtful handling of spiritual themes helps God Friended Me overcome—and even benefit from—its earnest approach to a potentially off-putting premise." Metacritic, which uses a weighted average, assigned a score of 57 out of 100 based on 14 critics, indicating "mixed or average reviews".

In his review of the show's pilot episode, Matthew Gilbert of The Boston Globe wrote that "Based on the title alone, I was fully prepared to despise this show", but declared that "the premiere holds some promise as a thoughtful feel-good drama." Michael Starr of the New York Post wrote that "While 'God Friended Me' does sometimes stray into saccharine-sweet, 'Touched By An Angel'-type territory [...] it doesn't overstay its welcome and seems to know when to dial it back and inject some levity into the proceedings." Steve Greene of IndieWire gave the show a grade of "C", writing that "It's anchored by a likable cast, and works from an admirably high-concept premise, but for now the result is an overstuffed hodgepodge of exaggerated emotions and familiar swings at family drama."

Vinnie Mancuso of Collider gave the show a rating of three stars, calling Hall's performance as Miles "endlessly likable" but writing that the show is "heavy on the hamminess, rooted in religion and old-fashioned morality, and misunderstands the lifestyle of your average human under the age of 35 on every fundamental level". Hemant Mehta of Patheos wrote that God Friended Me is "not a bad show", but criticized the show for presenting Miles' atheism as being a result of his mother's death. Mehta wrote that "In short, he's an atheist because he went through something traumatic [...] it bears no resemblance to why so many atheists today don't believe in God."

Ratings
The website TV Series Finale acknowledged that during the show's second season, ratings averaged 25% less in the key 18-49 demo compared to the first season. Overall viewership fell 20% compared to the first season. TV Line reported that God Friended Me had the "smallest gain via Live+7 DVR playback — just 23 percent — of any scripted CBS program."

Season 1

Season 2

Broadcast
God Friended Me premiered in the United States and Canada on September 30, 2018. The series premiered in Australia on November 5, 2018.

References

External links

2010s American comedy-drama television series
2018 American television series debuts
2020 American television series endings
2020s American comedy-drama television series
Atheism in television
American fantasy drama television series
American fantasy television series
CBS original programming
English-language television shows
Fiction about God
Religious comedy television series
Christian drama television series
Television productions cancelled due to the COVID-19 pandemic
Television series by CBS Studios
Television series about social media
Television series by Warner Bros. Television Studios
Television shows set in New York City
Works about Facebook